B. Jaya (11 January 1964 – 30 August 2018) was an Indian film director who worked in Telugu cinema.

Early life
Jaya completed an MA in English literature and received a diploma in journalism at Chennai University. She also received an MA in psychology from Annamalai University.

Jaya married producer and publicist B. A. Raju (died 2021). They have two sons.

Career
After completing her education, she started her career as a writer for the Telugu daily newspaper Andhra Jyothy. She wrote for the publication's "Jyothi Chitra" section, which covers news regarding the Telugu cinema industry. She made her debut as a director with the successful 2003 film Chantigadu.

Death
Jaya died on 30 August 2018 at the age of 54 due to heart related ailments.

Filmography

References

External links
 

1964 births
2018 deaths
Film directors from Hyderabad, India
Place of birth missing
Telugu film directors
Indian women film directors
Annamalai University alumni
21st-century Indian film directors
21st-century Indian women artists
Missing middle or first names